Myxotrichum is a genus of fungi belonging to the family Myxotrichaceae.

The species of this genus are found in Europe and Northern America.

Species

Species:
 Myxotrichum aeruginosum 
 Myxotrichum albicans 
 Myxotrichum arcticum 
 Myxotrichum chartarum

References

Fungi